Hugo Álvarez may refer to:

 Hugo Álvarez (footballer, born 1985), Spanish retired football centre-back
 Hugo Álvarez (footballer, born 2003), Spanish football midfielder